Moses Henriques may refer to:

 Moses Cohen Henriques, Sephardic pirate
 Moises Henriques (born 1987), Australian cricketer